Albert Edgar Solomon (7 March 1876 – 5 October 1914) was an Australian politician. He was Premier of Tasmania from 14 June 1912 to 6 April 1914.

Solomon graduated B.A. in 1895 and LL.B. in 1897 at the University of Tasmania, and subsequently qualified for the degrees of M.A. and LL.M. He was admitted to the bar in February 1898. He entered politics as one of the six MHAs for Bass in April 1909, and almost immediately became attorney-general and minister for education in the Elliott Lewis second and third ministries, taking the additional position of minister of mines in October 1909. When Lewis retired in June 1912, Solomon became premier, attorney-general and minister of education, but he had a bare majority of one and it required much tact and finesse to keep the ministry going until April 1914. Attention was given to education and considerable additions were made to the number of state and high schools. Never a robust man, Solomon's health broke down, likely from stress, and he died at Hobart aged 38 on 5 October 1914. He was a prominent member of the Methodist Church and a temperance reformer.

Family
On 13 August 1903 Solomon married Una "Elsie" Scott, eldest daughter of Jabez Scott of Launceston. They had two sons

Sources

References

1876 births
1914 deaths
Premiers of Tasmania
University of Tasmania alumni
Leaders of the Opposition in Tasmania
Australian Methodists
Australian temperance activists